Kozakiewicz is a Polish surname. See also:

Andrzej Kozakiewicz (born 6 July 1966 in Piła) is a master of politology and musician, co-founder of Pidżama Porno, Strachy na Lachy and Świat Czarownic.
Mikołaj Kozakiewicz (1923, Slonim - 1998) was a Polish politician, publicist and sociologist
Władysław Kozakiewicz (born 8 December 1953) is a Polish pole vault jumper, an Olympic champion at the 1980 Summer Olympics
Kozakiewicz's gesture, alternative name for bras d'honneur